Shapur I's Ka'ba-ye Zartosht inscription (shortened as Shapur-KZ, ŠKZ, SKZ), also referred to as The Great Inscription of Shapur I, and Res Gestae Divi Saporis (RGDS), is a trilingual inscription made during the reign of the Sasanian king Shapur I (240–270) after his victories over the Romans. The inscription is carved on the Ka'ba-ye Zartosht, a stone quadrangular and stepped structure located in Naqsh-e Rustam, an ancient necropolis located northwest of Persepolis, in today's Fars Province, Iran. The inscription dates to c. 262.

Content

The inscription is written in Middle Persian, Parthian, and Greek, containing 35, 30, and 70 lines, respectively. The Middle Persian variant is partially damaged, while the Greek and Parthian versions are better preserved, although they are not exactly the same as the Middle Persian text. In this inscription, Shapur introduces himself, mentions his genealogy, enumerates the provinces of his empire, describes his campaigns against the Roman Empire and talks about the fire temples he built. The inscription is considered the most important inscription from the Sasanian era.

The relevant passage enumerating the territories part of Shapur I's empire :

In the inscription, Shapur I mentions his victories over Gordian III, Philip the Arab and Valerian. He relates that Gordian departed from Antioch and was killed in a decisive battle at Misiche in 242/4 on the border of Sasanian-ruled Mesopotamia. Shapur mentions that Misiche was subsequently renamed Misiche-Peroz-Shapur, which translates as "Misiche-(where)-Shapur-is-victorious". In relation to Philip the Arab; Shapur mentions that negotiations in 244 resulted in Philip being forced to pay 500,000 denarii to the Sasanians. In addition, the Romans promised that they would surrender Armenia to Shapur. However, Shapur relates that the Philip the Arab didn't keep his promise and tried to reinvade Armenia. As a result, another battle was fought in 252-256 at Barbalissos, against a 60,000-strong Roman army. Shapur was victorious, and he mentions that he captured 36 Roman cities. Shapur also mentions his major victory at the Battle of Edessa, which resulted in Valerian being captured by the Sasanian ruler, "along with the Praefectus Praetorio, senators, and chiefs of the army". He furthermore relates that Roman captives were settled in the province of Pars (i.e. Persis). The Oxford Dictionary of Late Antiquity notes that this particular part of the inscription, where Shapur mentions the capture of Valerian and his deeds in general, is reminiscent of the "Persian epic tradition".

In the following part of the inscription, Shapur mentions the Zoroastrian sacred fires he established under his rule to honor each member of the royal family. He also mentions detail of "sacrifices and ceremonies". The final part of the inscription contains valuable content about the Sasanian administration as well as the courtiers and nobles during the lifetimes of Papak, Ardashir I in addition to Shapur I himself.

See also
Behistun inscription
List of Sasanian inscriptions

References

Sources
 
 Full English translation of the inscription in

External links
 "The Inscription Of Shapur I At Naqsh-E Rustam In Fars", Warren Soward (English translation)
 "The trilingual inscription of Šābuhr at “Kaaba i Zardušt” (ŠKZ)" (transcription of full text with English translation)
 "Third Century Iran: Sapor and Kartir", Martin Sprengling (letter-by-letter transliteration of full text with English translation)

Sasanian inscriptions
Naqsh-e Rustam
Shapur I
3rd-century documents
3rd-century inscriptions
Parthian language
Greek inscriptions
Latin words and phrases